The 2014–15 V Football Group season was the 65th season of the Bulgarian V Group. The group comprises the third level of the Bulgarian football pyramid and is divided into four geographic regions:North-West, North-East, South-East, and South-West.

The top team from each of the divisions of the amateur football group (AFG) will be directly promoted to B Group for season 2015–16. The bottom two teams of each division will be directly relegated to their respective regional groups at the fourth level in the football league system for next season.

Changes from season 2013–14

Club Movements Between V Group and B Group
The champions of the four 2013–14 V AFG divisions were promoted to the 2014–15 B PFG: Benkovski Byala from V AFG North-East and Sozopol from V AFG South-East, Lokomotiv 2012 Mezdra from V AFG North-West and Pirin Blagoevgrad from V AFG South-West.

In return, four teams relegated to V AFG: Vitosha Bistritsa, Kaliakra Kavarna, Dunav Ruse and Akademik Svishtov.

Club Movements Between V Group and the Regional Groups
 North-East: Silistra 2009, Shumen 2010 and Veliki Preslav relegated last season to regional divisions. On 17 June 2014 Benkovski Byala, champions from last year, declared their incapability to participate in B Group, therefore they decided to remain in the third division. The next team eligible for promotion, Svetkavitsa Targovishte declared the same, therefore last season there was no promoted team from the North-East division. The only new team this season, coming from the regional divisions, is Dorostol 2003.
 North-West: Gigant Belene and Tryavna relegated from last season to regional divisions. Due to the replacement of initial participants into B Group with new ones, the second-placed, Lokomotiv Gorna Oryahovitsa, was promoted. The only new team this season, coming from the regional divisions, is Juventus Malchika.
 South-East: Straldzha relegated from last season to regional divisions, while Brestnik resigned after just two rounds of play. Due to the replacement of initial participants into B Group with new ones, the second- and third-placed, Master Burgas under its new name FC Burgas and Vereya Stara Zagora were promoted. New teams, coming from A PFG, were supposed to be Neftochimic Burgas and Lyubimets, as they have not received professional license. However by 25 July, the final deadline for application for participation, both teams have not submitted any documents. The new teams, coming from the regional divisions, are Marista Plovdiv, Pomorie, Rodopa Smolyan, Stara Zagora and Elhovo. Shortly before the beginning of the championship, on 5 and 7 August Rodopa and Elhovo declared their resignation of participation due to organizational and financial reasons. Since this occurred two days before the start of the season, the regional cell of Bulgarian Football Union were unable to make new draw. This means that two teams will rest each round and that there will be no relegating teams, if there are no teams, coming from B Group at the end of the season.
 South-West: Botev Ihtiman and Septemvri Sofia relegated from last season to regional divisions. Due to the replacement of initial participants into B Group with new ones, the second-placed, Septemvri Simitli, was promoted. New team, coming from A PFG, is Pirin Gotse Delchev as it has not received professional license. The new teams, coming from the regional divisions, are Conegliano German and Rilski Sportist Samokov.

North-East V AFG

South-East V AFG

North-West V AFG

South-West V AFG

References

Third Amateur Football League (Bulgaria) seasons
3
Bulgaria